Events from the year 1264 in Ireland.

Incumbent
Lord: Henry III

Events
The earliest known Irish Parliament met at Castledermot on 18 June.

References 

 
1260s in Ireland
Ireland
Years of the 13th century in Ireland